The 31st Test and Evaluation Squadron is a United States Air Force unit, assigned to the 753d Test and Evaluation Group, stationed at Edwards Air Force Base, California as a geographically separated unit of the 53rd Wing.  The 31 TES is an Air Combat Command (ACC) tenant unit at Edwards, providing personnel to support combined test and evaluation on Air Force weapons systems.

The squadron is one of the oldest in the United States Air Force, its origins dating to 26 June 1917, being organized at Kelly Field, Texas.   The squadron deployed to England as part of the American Expeditionary Force during World War I.   The squadron saw combat during World War II, and later became part of the Strategic Air Command (SAC) during the Cold War.

Overview
The squadron provides Air Combat Command personnel to support combined test and evaluation on Air Force weapons systems. The unit also provides the Air Force Operational Test and Evaluation Center at Kirtland Air Force Base, New Mexico, and Air Force Materiel Command with test team members who have an operational perspective to perform test and evaluation on Combat Air Force systems.

The 31st is one of the oldest squadrons in the Air Force, its origins dating to 26 June 1917. Over this time, members of the squadron took part in World War I, World War II, and the Korean War.

History

World War I
The 31st Test and Evaluation Squadron traces its history to the organization of the 31st Aero Squadron at Kelly Field, Texas, on 26 June 1917, shortly after the United States' entry into World War I. The first commander of the squadron was 1st Lieutenant John E. Rossel. It received personnel from First Company, B Provisional Battalion. About the first of July, orders were received to equip the squadron for overseas duty.  The entire month of July was spent in drill and preparation for foreign service. Captain Carl Spaatz, who would later go on to become the first Chief of Staff of the United States Air Force. was placed in command on 13 July, bringing with him several men of previous military experience, who added much to the efficiency of the organization.

Across the Atlantic
The squadron left Kelly field on 11 August for Fort  Totten New York, and after waiting transportation, the 31st was transported on 22 August to the Port of Entry, Hoboken, New Jersey, and were boarded on the RMS Baltic.  The next day, they left Pier 59, en route to Halifax, Nova Scotia where the ship anchored awaiting for a convoy.  Finally, on 5 September, the convoy was formed and the trans-Atlantic journey began.

On the night of 14 September, two red rockets were fired from an accompanying destroyer that had spotted a submarine periscope.   The destroyer dropped depth charges on the submarine, and the Baltic made a sudden turn to port, that caused both men and anything loose aboard the ship to move.  Suddenly a large explosion was heard and five long blasts were made by the ship's whistle and everyone on board was ordered to report to their assigned lifeboats.   The Baltic's captain announced that a torpedo had struck the ship, but it had only made a glancing blow on the bow; that the emergency pumps were working and there was no danger. The next day, the Baltic arrived in Liverpool, England, and the men immediately boarded the train for Southampton, arriving at 1:00am on 15 September.

3d Aviation Instruction Center
At Southampton, 50 of the men were detached from the squadron and were sent to various Royal Flying Corps schools to undergo training in machine gunnery and airplane construction.  These schools were at Grantham, Uphaven, Lincoln and Reading, England.   The remainder of the squadron proceeded to France, arriving in Le Havre on the 19th, and from there boarded a troop train to the First Army Air service Mechanics Regiment at Étampes.  There, the squadron was divided into three detachments.  Two were assigned to the Training Section of the AEF, being sent to French aircraft mechanics schools at Paris and Lyons.  The third detachment was ordered to proceed to the 3d Air Instructional Center at Issoudun Aerodrome.

Initially, the men of the squadron at Issoudun were engaged in construction projects, such as putting up new buildings, hangars and other necessities to make the 3d AIC operational.  The squadron was recombined at Issoudun Aerodrome just after Christmas Day, 1917. The men had been thoroughly trained in aircraft assembly, engine maintenance and the other skills needed for them to do their work at the 3d AIC. The men from England arrived on 14 January, and they had become instructors in pistol, rifle, and machine-gunnery. The duties of the squadron became the maintenance of the training aircraft, primarily French Nieuports at the school, which had been set up by the Training Section, AEF to train American pursuit pilots prior to them being sent into combat at the Front.

The 31st Aero Squadron was assigned to the care and upkeep of Nieuport 15-meter aircraft (Nieuport 17, 17bis, 21, 23, 24, 24bis, and 27s) at Field No. 5, which was used for taxiing, taking off, and landing and wing slips.   It was at Issoudun that the squadron emblem, still in use today, was designed.  In their off-hours, the men engaged in sports such as boxing and football. Athletics was an important part of the duty at Issoudun, giving the squadron, which was widely divided around the station, an esprit-de-corps and helped build morale. In addition to the aircraft work, squadron members were also engaged in expanding the 3d Aviation Instruction Center as necessary, erecting additional buildings and aircraft hangars as new airfields were required as training was expanded with additional pilots and aircraft.

During the month of September 1918, training was especially intense as new pilots, to be assigned to the new Second Army Air Service, began to arrive for instruction. By the time of the Armistice on 11 November, the men of the squadron held responsible positions in many of the support areas of the 3d Aviation Instruction Center. Although they did not enter combat, the men provided the means to train the pilots who went to the front and gave them the best of training so they might accomplish their work.

Demobilization
The 31st remained at Issodun until the end of December 1918 when orders were received to proceed to the 1st Air Depot, Colombey-les-Belles Airdrome, France, for demobilization.   From Colombey, the squadron was moved to a staging camp under the Services of Supply at Bordeaux, France, in January waiting for a date to report to a base port for transportation home.    In mid-March, the squadron boarded a troop ship, arriving in New York on 5 April.   From there, the 31st moved to Mitchel Field, New York where the men were demobilized and returned to civilian life. The 31st Aero Squadron was demobilized on 14 April 1919 at Mitchel Field, New York.

Inter-war years

The 31st Bombardment Squadron was reconstituted as a reserve Army Air Service unit on 24 March 1923, being assigned to the 7th Bombardment Group in the Third Corps Area. It was an active associate unit to the 49th Bombardment Squadron at Langley Field, Virginia. Its members spending their reserve commitments with the 49th, primarily supporting the Dayton-Wright DH-4s of the squadron. It was moved to the Ninth Corps Area in California on 28 February 1927 but never fully organized in the reserves. It was then moved to the Eighth Corps Area in Texas on 1 September 1928, and its members trained as individual reservists at Kelly Field.

On 1 April 1931 it was transferred to the United States Army Air Corps as a regular unit without reservists, being activated at March Field, California and assigned to the 7th Bombardment Group.  It was initially equipped with Keystone B-3 and B-4 biplane bombers, the bombers usually differed from each other only in the type of engine which powered them, and it was often only possible to distinguish one from the other by an examination of their serial numbers.   The Keystone planes were the standard Army bomber during the 1920s and about as powerful as their World War I contemporaries, but in terms of safety they were much improved.

The group was transferred on 5 December 1934 to the newly built Hamilton Field, near San Francisco, as part of a realignment of the Air Corps units in California due to the closure of Rockwell Field near San Diego and the transfer of units from Rockwell to March Field.  At Hamilton Field, the 31st was upgraded Martin B-10 and B-12s, the first all-metal monoplane bomber to enter full production for the Army. It was also the first bomber to have a performance that exceeded that of contemporary pursuit aircraft.  Again, the main difference between the bombers was the engine type.   In the spring of 1937, the 31st received new Douglas B-18 Bolos, the 7th Group being the first operational unit to receive the bombers.

The squadron trained at Hamilton until the end of 1937, when it was ordered to proceed to Hickam Field, Hawaii, to reinforce the Hawaiian Department.   It departed from the port of San Francisco on the USAT Republic on 1 February 1938, arriving at the port of Honolulu on 8 February and transferring to Hickam the same day, being assigned to the 5th Composite Group. The 31st joined the 23d and 72d Bombardment Squadrons at Luke Field on Ford Island which were equipped with Martin B-12s. The 31st had brought its B-18s with it to Hickam, and it began engaging in reconnaissance flights over the Islands. In mid-1941, the 5th Bombardment Group began receiving B-17D Flying Fortresses from the United States, as part of the United States buildup of its Pacific forces due to rising tensions with the Japanese Empire.

On 6 December 1941, the 5th had a total of 12 B-17Ds on the line at Hickam Field, along with 33 B-18s.  Five additional B-17Ds with the 11th Bombardment Group, were also on the line at Hickam.  The 38th Reconnaissance Squadron with four B-17Cs and two new B-17Es were inbound from Hamilton Field to Hickam on their way to Clark Field in the Philippines to reinforce the American force there.

World War II
During the Japanese attack on Pearl Harbor, 7 December 1941, 5 of the B-17Ds were destroyed, and the rest were damaged.  Most of the B-18s were destroyed on the ground in the initial Japanese onslaught. The ones that remained played no significant role in subsequent operations.  The 38th Reconnaissance Squadron arrived at Oahu at the height of the attack (radar operators mistakenly thought that the Japanese attack force was this flight arriving from California). Some of the planes managed to land at the short Haleiwa Fighter Strip, one set down on a golf course, and the remainder landed at Hickam under the strafing of Japanese planes. The 31st suffered eighteen casualties among assigned and attached personnel; four were killed and fourteen others wounded (two of the latter died of their wounds).

Defense of the Hawaiian Islands

In the aftermath of the attack the planes that could be repaired were put back on the line, and were reinforced by the wider-tailed B-17E that had a tail gunner position. For the balance of 1942, the 31st remained in Hawaii, its aircraft flying long range reconnaissance missions from Kipapa Airfield and Kualoa Airfield. Its patrols ranged three or four hundred miles out from Oahu, searching for anything that might betoken another attack on Hawaii. In February the Hawaiian Air Force became the Seventh Air Force, and the 18th Bombardment Wing (comprising the 5th and 11th Groups) became the VII Bomber Command.

During this time, Hickam Field was taken off of operational status, being repaired from its battle damage and also becoming an Air Transport Command way-station, and the establishment of the Hawaiian Air Depot as a modification center for Air Technical Service Command, preparing planes for operation in the Pacific Theater with necessary modifications prior to their deployment to the combat areas.

In June 1942, during the Japanese threat to Hawaii with its Midway Island attack, the 31st was used for high-altitude bombing attacks against the Japanese carrier strike fleet.  The squadron claimed the sinking of a large transport and numerous hits on a carrier, a battleship, and a cruiser., however, it was later learned that none of the bombs dropped by the bombers actually hit a single Japanese ship. An attack against naval vessels at sea was found to be a job best done by low-altitude medium bombers or by dive bombers.

Combat in the South Pacific

The victory at the Battle of Midway eliminated the Japanese threat against Hawaii.  In November 1942, the 31st was deployed to Espiritu Santo in the South Pacific to fly long-distance bombing missions against Japanese forces in the Solomon Islands as part of the Mobile Force, Pacific.  By January 1943, the 31st was flying combat missions from Espiritu Santo, or when possible, from Henderson Field, Guadalcanal, under a joint headquarters commanded by Colonel L.G. Saunders.  Through the latter part of 1942 during the Battle of Guadalcanal, the 31st B-17s were as busy as the meager supply of fuel would permit them to be. They flew search missions over 1600 miles of open water. They made frequent attempts, generally unsuccessful, to stop the Tokyo Express — fast convoys that brought supplies and reinforcements from Japanese in the Northern Solomons through The Slot, as the expanse of sea between New Georgia and Santa Isabel Island was known, to the enemy forces on Guadalcanal.

In January 1943, the 5th Group was relieved from assignment to the Seventh Air Force and reassigned to the Thirteenth Air Force. Activation of the Thirteenth Air Force, which took place on 13 January 1943, was a step intended to improve the handling of AAF units in the South Pacific, all of which were put under the jurisdiction of the new Air Force. Brigadier General Nathan F. Twining. During the spring of 1943, the process of replacing B-17s with B-24D Liberator was begun.  The early B-24Ds received lacked firepower, especially in the nose of the aircraft. Japanese fighter pilots quickly discovered the deficiency and capitalized on it by making their attacks frontally. Lieutenant Colonel Marion D. Unruh—later Colonel and CO of the 5th—countered by designing a nose turret that eliminated the weakness; the Hawaiian Air Depot at Hickam installed the new turret in more than 200 B-24s during 1943.

As the tide of battle surged northward and westward through the Solomons, the Admiralties, the Caroline Islands, and finally to the Philippines, the heavy bombers of the 31st Bombardment Squadron as part of the 5th Bomb Group ranged ahead of the assault forces, bombing enemy convoys and installations, damaging—when they could not destroy—enemy airfields, fighting off Japanese fighters, and helping other elements of the Thirteenth Air Force, along with air units of the Navy, the Marine Corps, and the Royal New Zealand Air Force, to achieve air superiority over the Japanese air forces. The squadron raided the heavily defended Japanese base on Woleai during April–May 1944 and received a Distinguished Unit Citation (DUC) for its efforts.

Missions began to be flown in the Southwest Pacific Theater starting in June 1944 as the Japanese began their long retreat back to their Home Islands.   The 31st attacked enemy bases on Yap and in the Truk and Palau Islands, Jun–Aug 1944, preparatory to the invasion of Peleliu and the return to the Philippines at Leyte. Crews flew missions to the Netherlands East Indies on 30 September 1944, earning another DUC for an attack—conducted through heavy flak and fighter defenses—on oil installations at Balikpapan, Borneo.

From October 1944 to the end of the war the 5th Bomb Group completed a variety of missions, including raids on enemy bases and facilities on Luzon, Ceram, Halmahera, and Formosa; support for ground forces in the Philippines and Borneo; and patrols off the China coast. The end of the war found the 5th Bombardment Group on Samar, Philippine Islands; it had been operating from there since March 1945.

In the aftermath of World War II, the 31st was permanently assigned to Clark Field in the Philippines during December 1945, under the Thirteenth Air Force with its B-24Js.  In October 1947, its B-24s were scrapped and it received F-13 Superfortresses (B-29s modified as long-range reconnaissance planes) and was redesignated as the 31st Strategic Reconnaissance Squadron.  The redesignated 5th Reconnaissance Group was to engage in the Post Hostilities Mapping Program under the auspices of the Thirteenth Air Force; the target date for the project was 1 July 1949.   The Group was broken up into detachments, and the 31st was sent to Kadena Air Base, Okinawa, and was detached to Headquarters, Far East Air Force for operations when the 5th Reconnaissance Group returned to the United States in November 1949.

Korean War

In June 1950 with the breakout of the Korean War, the 31st was moved to Yokota Air Base, Japan on 12 July, to work operationally with the 91st Strategic Reconnaissance Squadron, which had deployed from McGuire Air Force Base, New Jersey also with RB-29s.  With the resources of the two squadrons combined, the joint unit eventually flew the largest number of different aircraft in the Korean War and had more assigned personnel than any other flying unit in Far East Air Force. The unit's primary mission included electronic counter measures and bomb-damage assessment photography.

The unit's RB-29 flew throughout the Korean peninsula in the early part of the war.  On 18 October 1950, a crew spied over 75 enemy fighter planes at Antung Airfield, across the Yalu River, immediately prior to the Chinese intervention. However, the unit was soon in trouble with the addition of MiG-15 aircraft into the air war. In November 1950, MiG's jumped a flak-damaged RB-29 near the Yalu river. In the ensuing aerial battle, the RB-29 rear gunner shot down one of the MiGs – the first MiG-15 shot down by a B-29 gunner. The RB-29 limped back to Japan and five crewmen were killed when it crashed during landing at Johnson Air Base. The FEAF restricted RB-29's from flying near the Yalu during daylight hours due to their vulnerability to the MiG-15s. In November 1950, the 31st was relieved from its mission and it transferred its assets at Yokota to the 91st SRS.   The squadron returned to the United States and re-joined its home unit, the now 5th Strategic Reconnaissance Wing at Fairfield-Suisun Air Force Base, California.

Strategic Air Command
Much had changed since the 31st left Hamilton Field for Hawaii with its B-18s in the almost 13 years when it returned to Travis Air Force Base.  On 14 November 1950, the group was re-designated the 5th Strategic Reconnaissance Wing (Heavy).

In December, an all-out conversion effort began and in January 1951, the wing received its first two RB-36D Peacemaker strategic reconnaissance aircraft.   During the early 1950s, the wing performed operations to probe the eastern borders of the Soviet Union and People's Republic of China. Little was known about the air defense capability of the Soviet Union at this time and the most effective way of determining their capability was to probe the borders and see with what were called "Ferret missions". These missions, found that west of the Bering Strait there was virtually no Soviet radar coverage. As a result of these missions, USAF war plans were drawn up which directed a massive bomber attack to hit Russia from this direction, flying on to land in the Middle East or Africa, or more likely bailing out as the aircraft ran out of fuel. Gradually, during the 1950s, the Soviets began filling in the gaps in their radar coverage over northern Siberia, but large gaps on the outer perimeter between Alaska and Murmansk were still wide open for many years to come.

On 1 October 1955, the mission of the 5th became strategic bombardment, although the first training in bombardment missions had begun in 1953.  The 31st was re-designated as the 31st Bombardment Squadron (Heavy).  The RB-36Ds were replaced with B-36J Peacemakers configured for intercontinental bombardment missions.  At that time, the wing began standing Strategic Air Command nuclear alerts.  The first Boeing B-52G Stratofortress jet bomber was delivered to the wing on 13 February 1959, and the 31st along with the 23d Bombardment Squadron were equipped with the jet bombers.

With the effect of the equipment change, SAC plans was to disperse its B-52 bomber force over a wide number of bases, in order to insure that an entire wing of planes could not be taken out in one attack.   The 31st with its 15 B-52s moved to Beale Air Force Base, California on 1 October 1959 and was reassigned to the 4126th Strategic Wing, a provisional organization set up at Beale, along with the 903d Air Refueling Squadron, flying Boeing KC-135 Stratotankers in support. At Beale, half of the squadron's aircraft were maintained on fifteen-minute alert, fully fueled, armed, and ready for combat. The 4126th's parent 14th Air Division also moved to Beale and the 4126th became responsible to provide support to the division as well as the San Francisco Air Defense Sector of Air Defense Command, which activated at Beale in 1959.

In 1962, in order to perpetuate the lineage of many currently inactive bombardment units with illustrious World War II records, Headquarters SAC received authority from Headquarters USAF to discontinue its Major Command controlled (MAJCON) strategic wings that were equipped with combat aircraft and to activate Air Force controlled (AFCON) units, most of which were inactive at the time which could carry a lineage and history. As a result, the 4126th SW was replaced by the newly re-designated 456th Strategic Aerospace Wing (456th SAW), which assumed its mission, personnel, and equipment on 1 February 1963. In the same way the 744th Bombardment Squadron, one of the 456th's World War II historical bomb squadrons, replaced the 31st Bombardment Squadron, taking over its personnel and aircraft in an administrative reassignment.  The 31st was subsequently inactivated on 1 February 1963.

Modern era

On 1 July 1986 the squadron was re-activated as the 31st Test and Evaluation Squadron at Edwards Air Force Base, California.   Its mission was to support the General Dynamics FB-111 medium bomber for Strategic Air Command and to test modifications and upgrades prior to the changes being sent to field units. It also performed testing for modifications to the B-52 and B-1B Lancer strategic bombers and SR-71 Blackbird strategic reconnaissance aircraft.

In June 1992, with the inactivation of SAC, the squadron came under the new Air Combat Command (ACC).  Under ACC, the squadron has continued its mission on a wide variety of weapons systems, including the B-2 Spirit Stealth Bomber, F-16 and F-22 fighters, the Boeing 747 Airborne Ballistic Laser (ABL) and now the F-35A Joint Strike Fighter.

Operations and decorations
 Combat Operations
 Combat in Central Pacific, 7 December 1941 – c. 9 November 1942
 Combat in South Pacific, 30 November 1942 – c. 1 April 1944
 Combat in Western Pacific, 20 April 1944 – 2 September 1945
 Combat in Korea, 28 Jun – 15 November 1950.
 Campaigns
 World War II
 

 Central Pacific, 7 December 1941 – 6 December 1943
 Guadalcanal, 7 August 1942 – 21 February 1943
 Northern Solomons, 22 February 1943 – 21 November 1944
 Eastern Mandates, 7 December 1943 – 14 June 1944
 Bismarck Archipelago, 15 December 1943 – 27 November 1944
 Western Pacific, 17 April 1944 – 2 September 1945

 Leyte, 17 October 1944 – 1 July 1945
 Luzon, 15 December 1944 – 4 July 1945
 Southern Philippines, 27 Feb – Jul 1945
 China Offensive, 5 May–Sep 1945
 Air Combat, Pacific Theater, 7 December 1941 – 2 September 1945

 Korean War
 
 UN Defensive 27 Jun – 15 September 1950
 UN Offensive 16 Sep – 2 November 1950
 CCF Intervention 3–115 Nov 1950
 Decorations
 
 Distinguished Unit Citation
 Wadke Island, 18 Apr – 15 May 1944
 Borneo, 30 September 1944
 
 Presidential Unit Citation (Navy), 1942
 
 Air Force Outstanding Unit Award
 1 June 2006  –  31 May 2008, 1 June 2004  –  31 May 2006, 1 June 2002  –  31 May 2004, 1 June 1998  –  31 May 2000, 1 June 1994  –  31 May 1996, 30 May 1992  –  29 May 1994, 1 July 1990  –  29 May 1992, 1 July 1988  –  30 June 1990, 1 July 1985  –  30 June 1987, 1 June 1998  –  31 May 2000, 1 June 2002  –  31 May 2004, 1 June 2004  –  31 May 2006, 1 June 2006  –  31 May 2008

 
 Philippine Presidential Unit Citation (World War II)
 
 Republic of Korea Presidential Unit Citation, 7 Ju1 – 16 November 1950.

Lineage
 Organized as 31st Aero Squadron on 26 June 1917
 Demobilized 14 April 1919
 Reconstituted and redesignated as 31st Bombardment Squadron on 24 March 1923
 Activated in the reserve on 24 March 1923
 Inactivated in the reserve on 1 April 1931
 Activated on 1 April 1931
 Redesignated 31st Strategic Reconnaissance Squadron in October 1947.
 Redesignated 31st Bombardment Squadron (Heavy) in 1955.
 Discontinued, and inactivated on February 1963; personnel/aircraft/equipment transferred to 744th Bombardment Squadron
 Redesignated 31st Test and Evaluation Squadron.
 Activated 1 July 1986

Assignments

 Post Headquarters, Kelly Field, Texas, 26 June 1917
 Aviation Concentration Center, 11 August 1917
 Air Service Headquarters, AEF, British Isles, 16 September 1917
 Detachment attached to Royal Flying Corps for training, 16 September 1917 – 14 January 1918
 Air Service Headquarters, AEF, 19 September 1917
 Detachments attached to Training Section, AEF, 19 September – 25 December 1917
 3d Aviation Instruction Center, 23 September 1917
 1st Air Depot, December 1918
 Commanding General, Services of Supply, c. 6 January – c. 18 March 1919
 Eastern Department, c. 5–14 April 1919
 7th Bombardment Group, 24 March 1923 (Reserves)
 19th Bombardment Group, 1 September 1928 (Reserves)
 7th Bombardment Group, attached on 1 April 1931, and assigned on 30 June 1931

 5th Composite Group (later 5th Bombardment Group, 5th Reconnaissance Group), 1 February 1938 – 10 March 1947
 71st Reconnaissance Group, 20 October 1947
 Fifth Air Force (attached to 71st Reconnaissance Group, 18 August 1948)
 Thirteenth Air Force, 16 March 1949
 311th Air Division, 1 April 1949
 Second Air Force, 1 November 1949
 5th Strategic Reconnaissance Group, 1 December 1949 (attached to Far East Air Forces, December 1949 – 16 November 1950, 5th Strategic Reconnaissance Wing after 15 February 1951)
 5th Strategic Reconnaissance Wing (later 5th Bombardment Wing), 16 June 1952
 4126th Strategic Wing, 1 October 1959 – 1 February 1963
 Strategic Air Command, 1 July 1986
 USAF Air Warfare Center, 1 June 1992
 79th Test and Evaluation Group (later 53rd Test and Evaluation Group), 15 April 1993
 753rd Test and Evaluation Group, 1 October 2021 – present

Stations

 Kelly Field, Texas, 26 June 1917
 Aviation Concentration Center, Garden City, New York, 11 August 1917
 England, 15 September 1917
 Issoudun Aerodrome, France, 17 January 1918
 Mitchel Field, New York, 5 April 1919  – 14 April 1919
 March Field, California, 1 April 1931
 Hamilton Field, California, 5 December 1934
 Hickam Field, Hawaii, 8 February 1938
 Kipapa Airfield, Hawaii, 23 May 1942
 Kualoa Airfield, Hawaii, 9 September 1942
 In Transit (9 November 1942  – 30 November 1942)
 Pekoa Airfield, Espiritu Santo, New Hebrides, 30 November 1942
 Henderson Field, Guadalcanal, Solomon Islands, 17 January 1943

 Momote Airfield, Los Negros, Admiralty Islands, 20 April 1944
 Wakde Airfield, Netherlands East Indies, 20 August 1944
 Kornasoren (Yebrurro) Airfield, Noemfoor, Schouten Islands, 26 September 1944
 Wama Airfield, Morotai, Netherlands East Indies, 16 October 1944
 Guiuan Airfield, Samar, Philippines, 17 March 1944
 Clark Field, Philippines December 1945 – 10 March 1947
 Yokota Field, Japan 20 October 1947
 Kadena Field (later Kadena Air Base), Okinawa, Japan, 16 March 1949
 Yokota Air Base, Japan c. 12 July 1950
 Johnson Air Base, Japan, 14 August 1950  – 16 November 1950
 Travis Air Force Base, California, 16 November 1950
 Beale Air Force Base, California, 18 January 1960  – 1 February 1963
 Edwards Air Force Base, California,  1 July 1986  – present

Aircraft

 Nieuport 24, 1918
 Nieuport 27, 1918
 Keystone B-3A
 Keystone B-4
 Thomas-Morse O-19
 Douglas Y1B-7
 Martin B-10
 Martin B-12
 Douglas B-18
 Boeing B-17
 Consolidated B-24
 B-25 Mitchell
 Boeing B-29
 Convair B-36

 Boeing B-52
 Boeing B-52
 B-1B
 B-2
 FB-111
 F-16
 Lockheed SR-71 Blackbird
 RQ-3 DarkStar
 Global Hawk
 Boeing YAL-1
 MQ-9 Reaper
 F-22
 F-35

See also

 List of American aero squadrons
 List of B-52 Units of the United States Air Force

References

Notes
 Explanatory notes

 Citations

Bibliography
 
 
 
 
 
 
 
 
 
 

Military units and formations in California
0031